Fred Hess (November 13, 1858 – November 7, 1925) was an American politician,

Born in the town of Winchester, Winnebago County, Wisconsin, Hess moved to a farm in the town of Dale, Outagamie County, Wisconsin. In 1888, Hess and his wife to Clintonville, Wisconsin where he became chief of police. In 1900, Hess was elected sheriff of Waupaca County and was a Republican. He was on the board of trustees for the Waupaca County Asylum. In 1915, 1917, and 1921, Hess served in the Wisconsin State Assembly. Hess died in a hospital in Oshkosh, Wisconsin.

Notes

1858 births
1924 deaths
People from Clintonville, Wisconsin
People from Winchester, Winnebago County, Wisconsin
Wisconsin sheriffs
Republican Party members of the Wisconsin State Assembly
People from Outagamie County, Wisconsin